Rank comparison chart of air forces of Oceanian states.

Enlisted

See also
Air force other ranks rank insignia

References

Oceania
Air force ranks
Military comparisons